Abdul Qahar Khan Wadan is a Pakistani politician who had been a member of the National Assembly of Pakistan, from August 2013 to May 2018.

Political career
He ran for the seat of the Provincial Assembly of Balochistan as a candidate of Pakhtun-khwa Milli Awami Party (PKMAP) from Constituency PB-12 (Qilla Abdullah-II) in 2013 Pakistani general election but was unsuccessful. He received 5,822 votes and lost the seat to Zmrak Khan.

He was elected to the National Assembly of Pakistan as a candidate of the PKMAP from Constituency NA-262 (Killa Abdullah) in by-election held in August 2013. The seat became vacant after Mehmood Khan Achakzai who won it May 2013 election vacated the seat in order to retain the seat won in his home National Assembly constituency.

References

Living people
Pashtun people
Pakistani MNAs 2013–2018
People from Killa Abdullah District
Pashtunkhwa Milli Awami Party politicians
Year of birth missing (living people)
Place of birth missing (living people)